Legality of corporal punishment may refer to 
Child corporal punishment laws 
Judicial corporal punishment